The Luton-Dunstable Busway is a guided busway system in Bedfordshire, England, which connects the towns of Dunstable, Houghton Regis and Luton with Luton Airport. It was built on the route of a disused railway track and opened in September 2013. It is claimed to be the second longest busway in the world.

History
Various studies had been carried out since 1989 which examined options for solving transit problems in the Luton/Dunstable Urban Area, including British Rail's Network SouthEast Plan published in May 1989.
Bedfordshire County Council considered a number of possible schemes, including a single-track extension of Thameslink heavy rail services from Luton to Dunstable; a single-track diesel-powered rail shuttle service; a twin-track light rail system, with a possible extension to Luton Airport; and a segregated guided busway system. The guided bus scheme was selected in 1996 as the most cost-effective option. In April 1997, the newly created unitary authority of Luton Borough Council took over the lead role in the project. A process of ongoing consultations, grant applications and a public enquiry delayed the project by several years.

Luton Borough Council's early announcements for the Busway indicated that it would be designed as a bus rapid transit system named Translink Expressway, operated with a fleet of articulated buses of the Phileas type. The route was built on the old railway trackbed of the former Dunstable Branch Lines, which closed to passenger traffic in 1967 under the Beeching cuts.

After 20 years of planning, the Busway took three years to construct, at a cost of £91 million. It was originally budgeted at £51 million, but costs increased due to underground utilities, soil contamination  and the removal of Japanese knotweed. Design and construction was carried out by Arup and Parsons Brinckerhoff, including seven new bridges, and reconstruction of three bridges, bus stops and a new transport interchange at Luton Railway Station. The bulk of funding for the scheme came from the central government, with additional funds from Luton Borough Council and Central Bedfordshire Council, with additional section 106 contributions from developers. The Busway was opened 24 September 2013, five months later than scheduled, by Norman Baker MP, a Minister for Transport.

Two new bus stops were added to the system in early 2016 to serve the Chaul End area of Luton and Townsend Farm Road, near Houghton Regis.

Features
The  guided section is a rollway built from concrete beams. Because it is a segregated route, other vehicles are prohibited from using the Busway. "Car traps" have been installed near junctions with the public highways to prevent motorists from using the route.

Services

In accordance with the requirements of bus deregulation, bus services on the Luton to Dunstable Busway are operated by private bus companies: Arriva, Centrebus and Grant Palmer. Initially at peak times upon opening (services A, B, C, E), buses ran up to every seven minutes.

 on a typical week day there are 332 buses towards Dunstable. The services are: A from Luton Airport running 24 hours a day, B to Downside in Dunstable, C to Beecroft in Dunstable, CX to the Amazon warehouse on Boscombe Road, E to Toddington, F70 and F77 via Leighton Buzzard to Central Milton Keynes shopping centre, G to the Langdale area of Dunstable, Hi to Thorn, and Z via Houghton Regis. There is a similar service pattern towards Luton.

Incidents
There have been incidents involving buses on the Busway, including a bus becoming accidentally "derailed" from the concrete rollway, and buses moving at speed colliding with stationary buses.

A number of fatal accidents involving pedestrians have occurred on the Busway. In February 2019, a pedestrian was struck by a bus and later died of his injuries around 4:00a.m. near Hatters Way, and in January 2020, a 69-year-old man was hit by a bus travelling towards Dunstable at the Jeans Way bus stop, being pronounced dead at the scene. Following an inquest into this accident by the chief coroner in January 2021, Luton Borough Council were condemned for the lack of safety fencing and signage that allowed the man to freely access the busway.

Future expansion
This extension would create a direct rapid transit link from Leighton Buzzard railway station on the West Coast Main Line to Luton Airport.

See also 

 Other busway systems

References

External links

Luton to Dunstable Busway official website
 

Bus transport in England
Guided busways and BRT systems in the United Kingdom
2013 establishments in England
Transport in Luton/Dunstable Urban Area
Luton Airport